"My Boots" is a song by Canadian singer-songwriter Lights. It was released on October 11, 2010 digitally in Canada, and was released on October 19, 2010 in the US and the UK. It is a song about Lights' love of winter. "My Boots" was supposed to be included in Lights' second studio album Siberia, but was later cut out from the final track listing.

Background
On October 12, 2010, Lights Tweeted, "It'll be on the new record, but I'm not done it yet lol. Needs... More... Time..." Lights said in an interview that the second full-length album was supposed to "come out in August, but I'm not supposed to tell you that."

Quoted from Jess Kotanen, Lights' sister on the Official Lights Message Boards:

Critical reception 
"My Boots" has generally received positive reviews from critics. NeonLimelight.com stated that the song will make you want to "...strap on your dancing boots and hit the snow-covered streets to go out and dance on this one", complementing on the song's lyrics and the "...twinkling synth beat". The Daily Beat gave the song five stars, praising Lights for the synthy, "dance inflicted soon-to-be hit", calling the song her "...best offering yet".

Track listing

Charts

References

2010 singles
Lights (musician) songs
Synth-pop songs
2010 songs
Songs written by Tawgs Salter
Songs written by Lights (musician)
Warner Records singles